Carola Salvatella Panés (born 8 July 1994) is a Spanish field hockey forward who is part of the Spain women's national field hockey team.

She was part of the Spanish team at the 2016 Summer Olympics in Rio de Janeiro, where they finished eighth. On club level she plays for Club Egara in Spain.

References

External links
 
https://hub.olympic.org/olympians/carola-salvatella/
http://olympians.pointafter.com/l/53331/Carola-Salvatella
http://www.terrassadigital.cat/detall_actualitat/32637/carola/salvatella/sentencia/club/egara/derbi/amb/cd/terrassa.html#.WJjZg1UrLIU
http://egara.es/esteve-bosch-harmonia-dor-2016-carola-salvatella-plata-i-pere-arch-bronze/
http://www.gettyimages.com/photos/carola-salvatella?excludenudity=true&sort=mostpopular&mediatype=photography&phrase=carola%20salvatella
http://www.zimbio.com/photos/Carola+Salvatella
https://www.youtube.com/watch?v=-hVRWGG_R7g

1994 births
Living people
Olympic field hockey players of Spain
Field hockey players at the 2016 Summer Olympics
Spanish female field hockey players
Place of birth missing (living people)
Female field hockey forwards
Club Egara players